Shakir Hasanov Şakir Rəfi oğlu Həsənov (15 June 1947 – 27 March 2022) was an Azerbaijani engineer and politician.

Biography 
Hasanov was born in Boradigah, Masally District. He attended the Borodigah Village High School, where Hasanov later graduated in 1965. He then attended the Azerbaijan Technical University. In 1971, Hasanov worked as a laborer for which he later became a successful craftsman, in which he was considered an expert. He first worked as an engineer for the Kurdish Water Canal. Hasanov served as chief engineer for the MG Administration, in which he also served as the city councilman for the Sumgayit City Council from 1990 to 1995. He was honored with the Tarragi Medal in 2009.

Hasanov died in March 2022, at the age of 74.

References 

1947 births
2022 deaths
Azerbaijani engineers
Azerbaijani politicians
People from Masally District
Azerbaijan Technical University alumni
Recipients of the Tereggi Medal
20th-century Azerbaijani people
20th-century Azerbaijani politicians